Salmson is a French engineering company. Initially a pump manufacturer, it turned to automobile and aeroplane manufacturing in the 20th century,
returning to pump manufacturing in the 1960s, and re-expanded to a number of products and services in the late 20th and into the 21st century. It is headquartered in Chatou and has production facilities in Laval. It has subsidiaries in Argentina, Italy, Lebanon, Portugal, South Africa and Vietnam.

History
It was established by Émile Salmson (1858-1917) as Emile Salmson, Ing. as a workshop in Paris (1890),
making steam-powered compressors and centrifugal pumps for railway and military purposes.  Subsequently, joined by engineers George Canton and Georg Unné, it was renamed Emile Salmson & Cie, building petrol-powered lifts and motors (1896).

The company became one of the first to make purpose-built aircraft engines, starting before World War I and continuing into World War II.

After World War I the company looked around for other work and started making car bodies and then complete cars.

Car production finished in 1957.

Focus also moved back to pump production and the facilities moved to Mayenne in 1961.  The firm was bought by ITT-LMT in 1962 then by Thomson in 1976 and by Wilo in 1984.

Its headquarters today are in Chatou.

Aircraft manufacture

It moved to Billancourt and manufactured the Salmson 9 series of air- and water-cooled radial engines. During World War I Salmson made its first complete aeroplanes, mainly the two-seat fighter/reconnaissance plane, the Salmson 2A2. These were used in combat by both the French and the American Expeditionary force. The company also designed a prototype of a single seat scout/fighter, the Salmson 3, but this was not produced in large quantities. 
 
Salmson aircraft were also used for air mail to India in (1911).

Aeroplane manufacturing moved to Villeurbanne near Lyon.

Two world records were set by Maryse Bastié, who flew Le Bourget to Moscow (1931).

Aircraft
 Hanriot HD.3
 Hanriot H.26
 Hanriot H.31
 Hanriot H.33
 Salmson-Moineau A92H
 Salmson-Moineau S.M.1
 Salmson-Moineau S.M.2
 Salmson 1 A.3 (3-seat Artillery Spotter)
 Salmson 2 A.2 (2-seat Artillery Spotter)
 Salmson 2 Berline (Transport version of 2 A.2)
 Salmson 2 de l'Aéropostale
 Salmson 3 C.1 (Single-seat fighter)
 Salmson 4 Ab.2 (ground attack aircraft;)
 Salmson 5 A.2 (2-seat Artillery Spotter)
 Salmson 6 A.2 (2-seat Artillery Spotter)
 Salmson 7 A.2 (2-seat Artillery Spotter)
 Salmson 16 A.2 (2-seat Artillery Spotter)
 Salmson D-1 Phrygane (1934)
 Salmson D-2 Phrygane
 Salmson D-3 Phryganet
 Salmson D-4 Phrygane Major
 Salmson D-6 CriCri (1936)
 Salmson D-7 CriCri Major
 Salmson D-21 Phrygane
 Salmson D-211 Phrygane
 Salmson D-57 Phryganet

Aero engines 
Aero engines produced up to 1917 are shown in the following table:

Salmson post world War One engines
In common with several other French aero-engine manufacturers Salmson named their engines with the number of cylinders then a series letter in capitals followed by variant letters in lower-case. Engines not included in the 1932 table are listed here:

3 Ad
5 Ac
5 Ap-01
5 Aq-01
6 Ad?
6 TE
6 TE.S
7 Aca
7 Aq
7 M
7 Om

8 As
9 AB
9 ABa
9 ABc 172 kW (230 hp)
9 Az
9 A2c
9 M
9 Nd 131 kW (175 hp)
9 P

9 Y
11 B
12 C W-12
18 AB
18 Cm
18 Z
 Salmson 11 B
 Salmson 12 C W-12
 Salmson 18 Ab
 Salmson 18 Cm
 Salmson 18 Z
Salmson-Szydlowski SH18

Salmson air-cooled engines available in 1932 are tabled here:

Car manufacture

The Billancourt factory  became the car manufacturing plant directed by Emile Petit. As the firm had no direct car design expertise they started by building the British GN cyclecar under licence, displaying six cars at the 1919 Paris Salon.

In 1922 the car part of the business became a separate company, named Société des Moteurs Salmson.

The first Salmson car proper used a four-cylinder engine designed by Petit with unusual valve gear: a single pushrod actuated both inlet and exhaust valves pushing to open the exhaust and pulling to open the inlet. This was used in the AL models from 1921. Later the same year the company built its first twin-overhead-cam engine, which was fitted to the 1922 D-type, although most production at first used the pushrod engine.

Models included

Early models
AL (cyclecar, 1920),
D-type (1922)
VAL3 (1922),
AL3 (1923),
GSC San Sebastian,
Gran Sport (GS, 1924-30),
2ACT (1926).

Salmson won 550 automobile races and set ten world records (1921-28) before closing the racing department in 1929. 

S-series models
The S''-series cars took over from the D-type, starting in 1929 and becoming a long lived series.
S4 (1929–32)
S4C (1932)
S4D (1934)
S4DA (1935–38)
S4-61 (1938–51)
S4E (1938–51).

Post-War
 2300 Sport Coupe (1953 to 1957) 

After World War II the Salmson Typ S4E and Salmson Type S4-61 were re-introduced.  Initially, as before the war, they were in most respects mutually indistinguishable from the outside apart from the slightly longer nose on the Type S4-E.   The Type S4-61 retained its four-cylinder in-line 1,730 cc engine.   The standard body was a four-door sedan/saloon, 4510 mm in length for the four-cylinder car and 4610 mm with the larger engine.    As well as the sedan/saloon there was a four-seater two-door coupe version of the S4-61 although this variant represented barely 10% of the post-war  S4-61‘s total sales.   A few two-door cabriolets were produced.

In October 1947 a substantially updated body appeared for the Type S4-E, featuring more flamboyant wheel arches and lowered headlights, now set into the body work rather than perching above the front wings.    The revised frontal treatment also quickly found its way onto the coupé and cabriolet variants, making the 13CV (2312cc) S4-E easier to distinguish from the 10 CV (1730cc) S4-61 than hitherto.  Like France's other luxury car makers, Salmson sales suffered from a government taxation policy that penalised cars with large engines and a French economy which during the five-year period from 1945 to 1950 resolutely failed to show significant signs of growth.   Overall volumes were depressed.   Nevertheless, the 336 cars produced in 1948 – split between the 10CV and 13CV  cars in a ratio of approximately 2:1 – did provide grounds for cautious optimism when compared to the 1947 volume of just 143 cars built.

In 1950 a new car arrived in the shape of the Randonnée E-72. Car sales nevertheless continued to be slow in the postwar market.   The company's passenger car production reached a postwar peak of 1,162 in 1950, but by 1952 had slumped to just 89. The company had been kept going by its aircraft engine sales, although the factory had to close for a period.

A new car, the 2300 S, was shown in 1953 and it took part in the 1955, 1956 and 1957 Le Mans 24-hour races

After bankruptcy in 1953, all activities ended in 1957 and Renault bought the factory.

See also
British Salmson
List of aircraft engines

References

 
Engineering companies of France
Defunct aircraft manufacturers of France
French companies established in 1890
French brands
Car manufacturers of France
Luxury motor vehicle manufacturers
Defunct motor vehicle manufacturers of France
Defunct aircraft engine manufacturers of France
Technology companies established in 1890